The August F. Martzahn House  is a historic building located in the West End of Davenport, Iowa, United States. It has been listed on the National Register of Historic Places since 1983.

August F. Martzahn
August F. Martzahn was born in Davenport on January 26, 1861, the son of Fred Martzhan, an immigrant from Mecklenburg and Elizabeth (Beyer) Martzhan. He was educated in the city's public schools and learned the butchers trade. He opened his first shop at 1701 West Third Street when he was still 18 years old. Martzahn organized the Davenport Slaughter & Rendering Company, which was the only such business in the city and became one of the largest in Eastern Iowa. The company's specialty was rendering and dealing in hides. Martzahn married Minnie Schmidt in 1884 and they raised a son. He built this house along West Third Street in 1911.

Architecture
The Martzahn House continued the popular 19th-century tradition of combining several architectural styles into one house. This house combines Georgian Revival mass with decorative elements of the American Craftsman and the Prairie School. Those elements include the two-tone stucco façade, the geometrically patterned leaded glass, the large rectilinear brackets at the main entrance, and the wide eaves with projecting rafter ends. The short posts that support the deep cornice returns on the dormers are also of interest. The house was designed by Davenport architect Arthur Ebeling.

References

Houses completed in 1911
Bungalow architecture in Iowa
American Craftsman architecture in Iowa
Houses in Davenport, Iowa
Houses on the National Register of Historic Places in Iowa
National Register of Historic Places in Davenport, Iowa